The Ministry of Culture and Media is a ministry of the Croatian government in charge of preserving the country's natural and cultural heritage and overseeing its development. The ministry in its present form was created in 1994 in the Cabinet of Nikica Valentić, as the culture portfolio had previously been part of the Ministry of Education, Culture and Sports (1990–93) and the Ministry of Culture and Education (1993–94).

List of ministers

Notes
 nb 1.  As Minister of Education, Culture and Sports
nb 2.  As Minister of Education, Culture and Sports (15 April 1992 – 3 April 1993); as Minister of Culture and Education (3 April 1993 – 18 October 1994)

See also 
Vladimir Nazor Awards
List of World Heritage Sites in Croatia
Register of Cultural Goods of Croatia
Register of Protected Natural Values of Croatia

References

External links
Official website 

Culture
Croatia
Croatian culture